The Package is 2017 South Korean television drama starring Lee Yeon-hee, Jung Yong-hwa, Choi Woo-shik, and Yoon Park. It aired in both South Korea and China. In South Korea, it aired on JTBC every Fridays and Saturdays at 23:00 (KST) time slot from October 13, 2017.

Synopsis
Yoon So-so (Lee Yeon-hee) works as a travel guide in France. She leads a group of tourists on a package tour. The travelers all have their own stories. San Ma-roo (Jung Yong-hwa) joined the tour after being dumped by his girlfriend. Kim Gyung-jae (Choi Woo-shik) has been dating for the past 7 years. A mysterious man (Yoon Park) seems to follow Yoon So-so. Jung Yeon-sung (Ryu Seung-soo) joined the package tour with a partner, but he will not reveal what kind of relationship they are in. Han So-ran is a web designer and agonizes over staying single or marriage. Oh Gab-soo is extremely stubborn. Han Book-ja spent most of her life taking care of her husband. Jung Na-hyun (Park Yoo-na) is a woman whom other people cannot guess her age. They all do not want to become involved in each other's personal lives, but, while they travel together, they become closer and develop relationships.

Cast

Main
 Lee Yeon-hee as Yoon So-so
A tour guide of group of people.
 Jung Yong-hwa as San Ma-roo
A man who got betrayed by his girlfriend and goes on a trip by himself.

Supporting

Tourists
 Choi Woo-shik as Kim Gyung-jae
An office worker who has dated his girlfriend for 7 years.
  as Han So-ran
Gyung-jae's girlfriend, a web designer who is contemplating between dating and marriage.
 Ryu Seung-soo as Jung Yeon-sung
A man whose relationship to his partner is a mystery.
 Park Yoo-na as Jung Na-hyun
Yeon-sung's daughter, whose age can't be guessed.
  as Oh Gab-soo
A stubborn old man who always picks fights.
 Lee Ji-hyun as Han Book-ja
Gab-soo's wife, a woman who cared for her husband her whole life until she got sick.
 Yoon Park as Yoon Soo-soo
So-so's younger brother, who chases after her.

Others

 Jang Seung-jo as Bae Hyeong-goo, Yoon So-so's ex-husband.
  as Kim Tae-young
  as Oh Ye-bi, San Ma-roo's girlfriend.
  as Department Head
 
 Jung Hee-tae as San Ma-roo's colleague.
 Yang Dae-hyuk as Staff, Lohas Finance Education Center
  as Byung-se
 Hwang Young-hee as Yoon So-so's mother
 Lee Han-wi as Yoon So-so's father
  as Doo-ri's father
 Kim Young-sun as Doo-ri's mother

Special appearances
 Sung Dong-il as So-so's boss 
 Lee Young-ja as Woman in the airport (ep. 1)
 Lee Seung-joon as Doctor (ep. 3)

Production
 The Package was the first pre-produced drama by JYP Pictures.
 Filming took place on August 13, 2016 in Seoul, South Korea, then moved to Paris, Rennes, Saint-Malo, Mont Saint-Michel (France) from September 5 to October 26, 2016. It ended in early December 2016.

Original soundtrack

Part 1

Part 2

Part 3

Part 4

Part 5

Part 6

Ratings
In this table,  represent the lowest ratings and  represent the highest ratings.

Notes

References

External links
  
 
 

2017 in South Korean television
2017 South Korean television series debuts
South Korean romance television series
JTBC television dramas
Television series by JYP Entertainment
South Korean pre-produced television series
2017 South Korean television series endings